Scott Bloomquist (born November 14, 1963) is a nationally touring Dirt Super Late Model race car driver in the United States. Bloomquist was born in Fort Dodge, Iowa. He was inducted in the National Dirt Late Model Hall of Fame in its second class in 2002 and currently is the owner of Dirt Late Model chassis manufacturer Team Zero Race Cars.

Racing career
Bloomquist is the son of an airplane pilot for Air Cal.  While stationed in California, Bloomquist's father was invited to see his coworker race a stock car. The elder Bloomquist thought he should give racing a try, so bought a race car, motor, and some old tires. He tried racing, and decided to give the race car to his son. Bloomquist's first race was at Corona Raceway in Corona, California in August 1980. He won several races and the track championship in 1982.

In 1983 he heard about a $4,000-to-win race at the speedway in Chula Vista, California. He saw a picture of a flat-wedge-shaped race car that Charlie Swartz had used to win the Dirt Track World Championship in 1982, and he decided to build a race car like it for the Chula Vista race. Bloomquist won the race, lapping the field twice in the process.

After the race, his father wanted to sell the car since it was worth a lot of money. The two reached an agreement where the father would gradually be paid for the car if the newly graduated Scott Bloomquist would work at his father's new farm far across the country in Tennessee. He traded his 1957 Chevy for a truck and race hauler. After arriving in Tennessee, he tore up the car in qualifying at Newport Speedway. He worked for his father until he had enough money to repair the car. He won some races, earning just enough money to continue racing.

The next year he decided to race with a new car at Kingsport, Tennessee Speedway, which had begun hosting a $2,500-to-win event every Saturday night. "I come rolling into the race with my dad and there sits Larry Moore," Bloomquist said. "He was the fastest guy in dirt late model racing and there he sits. And my dad says, `Well, there goes that $2,500.'" Bloomquist qualified second fastest behind Moore and started out on Moore's outside in the first row. Bloomquist said, "Moore took the lead but was holding me up, so I knocked him out of the way and won. That's $2,500. Next week, I'm on the pole, Moore's outside and I won again. Now I'm sitting here with five grand and I'm thinking that things are starting to look up."

Bloomquist used the winnings to improve his race car. He continued working at his father's farm to pay off his original race car.

In 1988 he raced at Eldora Speedway's World 100 against the three-time winner and favorite Jeff Purvis. After qualifying for the feature, which is unusual for a rookie, he started seventh. Purvis took the lead early in the race. Bloomquist slowly caught Purvis and passed him for the win. Some people consider his win a fluke until Bloomquist took the pole position the following year and won the race again in 1990.

He raced in the Hav-A-Tampa series from 1993 to 1996, winning the national touring series in 1994 and 1995. He led the 1996 points until he lost all of his points for bumping another car under caution. He had 60 wins in the series during that time, second place had 18 wins.

With problems both on and off-track, he left racing and started reading. He read about the human body and mind. After he returned to racing a changed person. He took all of his sponsors off the car and used only black and white paint. He changed from his familiar number 18 to number 0. He put the yin yang symbol in the middle of the "0" to represent the balance that he found in his life. He later raced the number "0" car with a skull and crossbones through the middle of the number.

In 2003 Scott competed full-time on the Xtreme Dirt Car Series formerly Hav-A-Tampa Series and won his 5th championship for the organization.  2004 he raced in the World of Outlaws Late Model Series and won the season championship.

He was named the 2006 RPM Racing News driver of the year. That year he won The Dream ($100,000), Topless 100 ($45,000), Scorcher 100 ($20,000), Racefest ($20,000), Dixie Shootout ($15,000), and the Cedar Lake Nationals ($50,000). He also had nine wins in the Lucas Oil Late Model Dirt Series.

Bloomquist returned to series racing and won the 2009 Lucas Oil Late Model Dirt Series championship. 

He returned to the series in 2010 defending his points championship. Bloomquist would be the series runner up for 2011 scoring 15 victories. He also scored combined earnings north of $272,000 for the year.

In 2016 he was the Lucas Oil Late Model Dirt Series champion.

His 2019 season was delayed after injuries sustained in a street crash. He returned to action in June of 2019 with teammate Chris Madden and he had limited success while recovering from those wounds.
 
In 2020, Scott, teaming with Chris Madden, obtained sponsorship from Drydene, followed the World of Outlaws Late Model Series. 

2021 saw Bloomquist offering his ride to dirt modified standout Nick Hoffman of Moorseville, North Carolina after lingering medical issues rendered his piloting the Team Zero house car impossible.

Other notable race wins include the 1989, 1993, 1995, 2013 & 2015 Pittsburgher 100, only 5-time winner; 1988, 1990, 2000 and 2014 World 100; 1999, 2001, 2006, 2011 & 2017 Topless 100 in Batesville, Arkansas; the $100,000 Dream 100 at Eldora Speedway in 1995, 2002, 2004, 2006, 2008, 2013, 2017 and in 2018 becoming the race's first back to back winner. Knoxville Late Model Nationals; 1995, 2003, 2004, 2005, 2009.  6-time Show Me 100 champion: 1995, 2003, 2004, 2005, 2008, 2018; an eight-time winner of the National 100 at East Alabama Motor Speedway – 1990, 1993, 1994, 1997, 1999, 2001, 2002 & 2003; the 2007, 2012 & 2016 Firecracker 100 in Lernerville, Pennsylvania, only 3-time winner; 7-time winner, 1990, 1991, 2010, 2012, 2014, 2016 & 2017 of the Jackson 100 in Brownstown, Indiana; the 2010 Hillbilly 100 at West Virginia Motor Speedway; the 2011 Clash at the Mag in Columbus, Mississippi, the 2011 USA 100; the 2012 Commonwealth 100 at Virginia Speedway; 5-time winner, 1999, 2003, 2006, 2008, 2010 USA Nationals in Cedar Lake Speedway (Wi); the 1988 and 2000 North/South 100 at Florence Speedway in Union, Kentucky; 3-time winner of the Ralph Latham Memorial at Florence Speedway - 1991, 2006, 2016; the 2005 Dirt Track World Championship at K-C Raceway (now Atomic Speedway) in Chillicothe, Ohio and the 2014 & 2015 Dirt Track World Championship at Portsmouth (Oh) Raceway Park, becoming the event's first back to back winner. He scored his 500th career Late Model win at the Jackson 100 at Brownstown Speedway in Indiana on September 25, 2010, and his 6th Dixie Shootout on October 8, 2011, in Woodstock, Georgia. He also won the Bad Boy 98 at Batesville, Arkansas Speedway, and the inaugural "Buckeye Nationals" at Atomic (Ohio) Speedway in 2016. In December of 2016, he won the inaugural "Gateway Dirt Nationals" at the Dome at America’s Center in St. Louis, Missouri, which paid $20,000. In July 2018, Scott won his 600th feature race at the "Diamond Nationals" at Lucas Oil Speedway in Wheatland, Missouri.

He is nicknamed the "Voodoo Child", "Dirt Trax Dominator", "The Boss", "Bloomer" or "Black Sunshine".
In 2002, Bloomquist was in the second induction class of the National Dirt Late Model Hall of Fame in Union, Kentucky.

NASCAR 
In 2013, Bloomquist announced that he would be running in the NASCAR Camping World Truck Series' Mudsummer Classic at Eldora Speedway, driving for Kyle Busch Motorsports. After starting the race in 21st, Bloomquist, who elected to race without a front sway bar, fell to last place after 30 laps, and finished in 25th, two laps down.

Team Zero Race Cars
He is known for working on his racecars as the chief chassis builder. He used to race in chassis built by major chassis manufacturers. He would then modify the chassis with tricks that he learned during his decades of racing. He decided it would be easier to build his chassis than to modify someone else's design. He sold "Bloomquist Chassis" (aka TEAM ZERO) to select racers. Bloomquist Chassis helped in their entire program. In 2014, Bloomquist went into business with Michigan racer and businessman Randy Sweet and elected to halt mass chassis production for outside buyers and focus on select chassis building and design for Sweet/Bloomquist race cars. In 2019, Bloomquist ceased the Sweet/ Bloomquist chassis name and continued with his brand name while continuing to build chassis for select buyers.

Personal life
He has a daughter, Ariel Rouse Bloomquist. His hometown is Mooresburg in Hawkins County, Tennessee.

Injuries
In March 2019, Scott was severely injured in a motorcycle accident in Daytona Beach, Florida, and was hospitalized with extensive leg and hip injuries.

Troubles with the law

1993 Arrest
On October 5, 1993, Bloomquist was arrested and charged for possessing 2.7 grams of cocaine. "A girl I dated talked me into having someone get some cocaine for her," Bloomquist said. "She had gotten into trouble and the only way she could get out was by setting me up. And she talked me into doing something that no one else has ever been able to do." Bloomquist was found not guilty of felony sale and distribution and guilty of misdemeanor drug possession and possessing drug paraphernalia. "When they searched the house they found a short straw that had some residue of cocaine in it. The girl had left it there," Bloomquist said. He was sentenced in November 1994 to the maximum penalty, a $5,000 fine, and one year in prison. It was his first misdemeanor conviction, and he filed an appeal. His sentence was cut in half to 6 months in jail. He served his time as a work release beginning in 1997.

2003 Arrest
On June 20, 2003 Bloomquist was stopped by police and after finding a white powdery substance as well as failing a field sobriety test he would be charged with driving under the influence and possession of cocaine.

2013 Investigation
In 2013 Bloomquist was investigated by police after an employee claimed he threatened “I’m either going to drown you or shoot you.” to the employee.

Motorsports career results

NASCAR
(key) (Bold – Pole position awarded by qualifying time. Italics – Pole position earned by points standings or practice time. * – Most laps led.)

Camping World Truck Series

 Season still in progress
 Ineligible for series points

Superstar Racing Experience
(key) * – Most laps led. 1 – Heat 1 winner. 2 – Heat 2 winner.

 Season still in progress

References

External links

1963 births
Living people
Sportspeople from Fort Dodge, Iowa
People from Hawkins County, Tennessee
Racing drivers from Iowa
NASCAR drivers